The twelfth season of the Oxygen reality television series Bad Girls Club is titled Bad Girls Club: Chicago, this is the seventh season to take place outside Los Angeles. Life coach Laura Baron makes appearances throughout the season to help the girls, starting a recurring role that lasts until the end of Season 15.

Cast

Original Bad Girls

Replacement Bad Girls

Duration of Cast

Episodes

Notes

References

External links

2014 American television seasons
Bad Girls Club seasons
Television shows set in Chicago